2005 in television may refer to:

2005 in Albanian television
2005 in American television
2005 in Australian television
2005 in Belgian television
2005 in Brazilian television
2005 in British television
2005 in Canadian television
2005 in Croatian television
2005 in Czech television
2005 in Danish television
2005 in Dutch television
2005 in Estonian television
2005 in French television
2005 in German television
2005 in Greece Television 
2005 in Indonesian television
2005 in Irish television
2005 in Israeli television
2005 in Italian television
2005 in Japanese television
2005 in Mexican television
2005 in New Zealand television
2005 in Norwegian television
2005 in Pakistani television
2005 in Philippine television
2005 in Polish television
2005 in Portuguese television
2005 in Scottish television
2005 in South African television
2005 in South Korean television
2005 in Spanish television
2005 in Swedish television
2005 in Thai television
2005 in Turkish television